The 1952 Titleholders Championship was contested from March 13–16 at Augusta Country Club. It was the 13th edition of the Titleholders Championship.

This event was won by Babe Zaharias.

Final leaderboard

External links
The Modesto Bee source

Titleholders Championship
Golf in Georgia (U.S. state)
Titleholders Championship
Titleholders Championship
Titleholders
Titleholders Championship
Women's sports in Georgia (U.S. state)